Visentin is a surname. Notable people with the surname include:

David Visentin (born 1963), Canadian television host
Mark Visentin (born 1992), Canadian ice hockey player
Louis Visentin, Canadian scientist
Santiago Visentin (born 1999), Argentine football player
Umberto Visentin (1909–1994), Italian footballer and manager